The 1998–99 EHF Women's Champions League was the sixth edition of the modern era of the 1961-founded competition for European national champions women's handball clubs, running from 4 September 1998 to 16 May 1999. Dunaferr NK defeated Krim Ljubljana in the final to follow the steps of Vasas SC as the second Hungarian club to win the competition. Defending champion Hypo Niederösterreich was defeated by the Slovenians in the semifinals.

Preliminary round

Round of 32

Group stage

Group A

Group B

Group C

Group D

Quarter-finals

Semifinals

Final

References

Women's EHF Champions League
Ehf Women's Champions League, 1998-99
Ehf Women's Champions League, 1998-99
EHF
EHF